Ell is a commune and small town in western Luxembourg, in the canton of Redange. It lies close to the border with Belgium.

, the town of Ell, which lies in the south-east of the commune, has a population of 340.  Other towns within the commune include Colpach-Bas, Colpach-Haut, and Roodt.

Population

References

External links
 

Communes in Redange (canton)
Towns in Luxembourg